International Day Commemorating the Victims of Acts of Violence Based on Religion or Belief is a United Nations-sponsored annual awareness day that takes place on 22 August as part of the UN's efforts to support Human Rights Related to Freedom of Religion or Belief. It was first introduced in 2019.

References

August observances
United Nations days
2019 introductions